Dry Doddington is a small village in the north-west of the South Kesteven district of Lincolnshire, England within the civil parish of Westborough and Dry Doddington.

History
Dry Doddington means the "dry estate of a man called Dodda". There was a deserted medieval village called 'Stocking' or 'Stockyng' associated with Dry Doddington in the early 14th century; its precise location is unknown.

Dry Doddington CE School was built as a National School in 1872, but was closed between 1926 and 1929, after which it re-opened as a primary school. It closed for the last time in 1961.

Today, the village forms part of the civil parish of Westborough and Dry Doddington, which had a population of 335 in 2001. Before 1931 Dry Doddington was a separate parish.

The village public house is The Wheatsheaf Inn on Main Street.

Geography
The village, on a small hill called Lincoln Hill, is surrounded by the River Witham to the west and south. The village of Claypole is to the north and Westborough and Long Bennington  to the south. The East Coast Main Line passes 1 mile to the north-east.

The Church of St James
The parish church, dedicated to St James, has a west-ward leaning tower.
It is a Grade II* listed building dating from the 12th century, with an early 14th-century tower. It was restored in 1876.

Recent restoration work, funded by the Heritage Lottery Fund, has brought the 14th century tower back to its former glory. The tower boasts an impressive tilt of 4.8 or 5.1 degrees, leaning more than the Leaning Tower of Pisa in Italy which is now tilted at 3.97 degrees.

The church contains a memorial to a No. 49 Squadron RAF Avro Lancaster that crashed near the village on 26 November 1944. The aircraft, called 'O-Oboe', was piloted by F/O Le Marquand (PB432). It had only been in the air for a few minutes before it crashed, laden with bombs and fuel. Whilst five members of the crew survived, Norman Langley, the wireless operator and air gunner, and Edward Blake, the mid-upper gunner, were killed.

References

External links

 Westborough and Dry Doddington Parish Council
 Crash memorial
Bomber History

South Kesteven District
Villages in Lincolnshire